Dovydiškiai (formerly) is a village in Kėdainiai district municipality, in Kaunas County, in central Lithuania. According to the 2011 census, the village had a population of 32 people.

At the beginning of the 20th century there were Dovydiškiai village and Dovydiškiai estate belonging to the Tyszkiewicz family.

Demography

Images

References

Villages in Kaunas County
Kėdainiai District Municipality